Sant Ponç is a locality located in the municipality of Clariana de Cardener, in Province of Lleida province, Catalonia, Spain. As of 2020, it has a population of 13.

Geography 
Sant Ponç is located 118km east-northeast of Lleida.

References

Populated places in the Province of Lleida